Nguyễn Thị Hoài Thu (January 7, 1985) is a Vietnamese taekwondo practitioner. She is a three-time medalist (two golds and one bronze) for the women's featherweight division at the Southeast Asian Games. She also captured two silver medals in the 53 and 59 kg classes at the 2006 Asian Games in Doha, Qatar, and at the 2010 Asian Games in Guangzhou, China, losing out to South Korea's Lee Sung-Hye and Thailand's Sarita Phongsri, respectively.

Nguyen qualified for the women's 57 kg class at the 2008 Summer Olympics in Beijing, after placing second from the Asian Qualification Tournament in Ho Chi Minh City, Vietnam. Unfortunately, she lost the first preliminary round match to Senegal's Bineta Diedhiou, with a sudden death score of 0–1.

References

External links
 

NBC 2008 Olympics profile

Vietnamese female taekwondo practitioners
1985 births
Living people
Sportspeople from Hanoi
Olympic taekwondo practitioners of Vietnam
Taekwondo practitioners at the 2008 Summer Olympics
Asian Games medalists in taekwondo
Taekwondo practitioners at the 2006 Asian Games
Taekwondo practitioners at the 2010 Asian Games
Asian Games silver medalists for Vietnam
Medalists at the 2006 Asian Games
Medalists at the 2010 Asian Games
Southeast Asian Games gold medalists for Vietnam
Southeast Asian Games bronze medalists for Vietnam
Southeast Asian Games medalists in taekwondo
Competitors at the 2005 Southeast Asian Games
Competitors at the 2007 Southeast Asian Games
Competitors at the 2009 Southeast Asian Games
21st-century Vietnamese women
20th-century Vietnamese women